Charles Alfred Howell Green (19 August 1864 – 7 May 1944) was an Anglican bishop of the Church in Wales. He was the first Bishop of Monmouth (1921–1928) and subsequently Bishop of Bangor during which time he served as Archbishop of Wales.

Biography

Green was born in Llanelli and was educated at Charterhouse School and Keble College, Oxford, where he was President of the Oxford Union in the Hilary term, 1887. He was ordained in 1889. 

He began his ministry with a curacy at Aberdare and was subsequently Vicar then Rural Dean of the area. In 1914 he was appointed Archdeacon of Monmouth, a post he held until his elevation in 1921 as the first bishop of the newly established Diocese of Monmouth.

He was expert at organisation and realising that the population of Monmouthshire had changed since the church was created he founded thirteen new parishes. The new parishes reflected the growth of industry and formed principally a new archdeaconry in Newport. He also redistributed the rural areas and created six new deaneries as part of the Archdeaconry of Monmouth. These were Abergavenny, Chepstow, Monmouth, Netherwent, Raglan, and Usk. (The latter two were later merged to create the new deanery of Raglan and Usk.)

Green was subsequently Bishop of Bangor (25 Sept. 1928–1944) during which time he also served as Archbishop of Wales (1934–1944). During the latter period he was assisted by a bishop of Maenan, the only instance of a place-name being given for this purpose subsequent to Disestablishment.

Cultured but with a reputation for authoritarianism, a representative of the High Church tradition, Green wrote a work on the church dedications of the Llandaff and Monmouth dioceses and the definitive guide to the constitution of the Church in Wales.

He died at Bishopcourt, Bangor, aged 79.

Works
The Setting of the Constitution of the Church in Wales, Sweet & Maxwell, 1937.

References

1864 births
1944 deaths
People educated at Charterhouse School
Alumni of Keble College, Oxford
Archbishops of Wales
Bishops of Bangor
Bishops of Monmouth
20th-century Anglican archbishops
Welsh Anglo-Catholics
Anglo-Catholic bishops
Presidents of the Oxford Union
Archdeacons of Monmouth
20th-century bishops of the Church in Wales
20th-century Anglican theologians
19th-century Anglican theologians